West Frankfort is a city in Franklin County, Illinois.  The population was 8,182 at the 2010 census. The city is well known for its rich history of coal. The city is part of the Metro Lakeland area.

History
Although one might associate the name "West Frankfort" with the city "Frankfurt" in Germany, or Frankfort in Kentucky, the truth is far more local. Around 1810, early Tennessee settler Francis ("Frank") Jordan and his seven brothers began the construction of no fort atop a hill in present-day Franklin County.  Completed in 1811, the fort was named "Frank's Fort," in Jordan's honor.

Frank's Fort was built in today's Williamson County, Ill., near Corinth. A few miles to the east, Francis' brother, Thomas Jordan, built "Jordan's Fort" in Cave Township, Franklin County, Ill., near the town of Thompsonville.

The construction of these forts was in response to the danger of attack during Tecumseh's War, which culminated in the Battle of Tippecanoe in 1811. Then-governor of the Illinois Territory, Ninian Edwards, actively encouraged the construction of these forts and offered the services of the Saline Militia in their erection. Thus, both Jordan family forts were built with the help of the Illinois Militia for safety of the civilians.

Since the Shawnee Trail, an important trading route linking Kaskaskia, Illinois and Old Shawneetown, Illinois, ran along the high ground in the vicinity of the fort, this area became an attractive destination for settlers in search of cheap land made available by the recently passed Bit Act of 1850.  The resulting settlement took the name of the nearby fort, which was subsequently shortened to "Frankfort."  Frankfort grew quickly during this period, with its population rivaling that of Chicago, at the time.

Frankfort was Franklin County's first county seat until 1839, when the lower half of the county was declared as Williamson County.

This new community became known as West Frankfort, for its location to the west of Frankfort. The two cities eventually merged and retained the name West Frankfort.

The area of West Frankfort formerly known as Frankfort is still sometimes referred to locally as Frankfort Heights or, more commonly, simply as "The Heights", due to its higher elevation relative to the rest of the city. A post office was maintained in Frankfort Heights until its destruction by fire in 2004, making West Frankfort one of the smallest cities in the United States to have two ZIP codes (the other zip code is designated as "Frankfort Heights, Illinois").

Beginning in 1904, the Deering Coal Mine Company took Franklin County and West Frankfort from no coal production in 1900 to being the #1 coal producer in Illinois by 1917. Once the mines opened, the population increased 3,500 in seven years. By 1927, West Frankfort's population had reached 19,896. In the late 1940s, four theatres and a minor league baseball team (see below) marked the downtown area.

Tri-State Tornado of 1925

1929 coal mine explosion 
On December 1, 1929, an explosion at the Old Ben Coal Company's Old Ben No. 8 Mine killed 7 people.

1947 coal mine explosion 
The Old Ben No. 8 Mine exploded again on July 24, 1947, killing 27 people.

West Frankfort Cardinals
The West Frankfort Cardinals were a minor-league baseball team from 1947 to 1950, serving as a Class D affiliate of the St. Louis Cardinals.

1951 coal mine explosion
The Orient No. 2 coal mine exploded on December 21, 1951, killing 119 men. The mine, located outside of West Frankfort, was one of the area's major employers.  According to lifelong residents, everyone in West Frankfort was affected by this tragedy, including grade schoolers of the time who remember their own losses or the suffering of classmates.  Many residents had even said they could never celebrate Christmas again.  After the catastrophe, the West Frankfort Junior High School became a temporary morgue for identification of the bodies, with many calls going out for funeral directors.  The explosion received national attention from the wire services, newspapers and Life Magazine.  Illinois Governor Adlai Stevenson visited the site to support those mourning. The United States Bureau of Mines called the explosion "avoidable,"  with the disaster resulting in Congress passing the Federal Coal Mine Safety Act of 1952. In 2020, after years of planning and funding, locals unveiled a new $40,000 memorial monument in Coal Miners Memorial Park, which reads the names of all 119 men killed in the disaster.

Eclipse crossroads of America
It will also be within the path  of totality of the solar eclipse of April 8, 2024, making it one of only a handful of cities within the direct paths of both eclipses.

Geography
West Frankfort is located at  (37.898545, -88.923315).

Demographics

As of the 2000 census, there were 8,196 people, 3,596 households, and 2,207 families residing in the city. The racial makeup of the city was 94.55% White, 2.13% African American, 0.23% Native American, 0.31% Asian, 0.09% Pacific Islander, 0.12% from other races, and 0.66% from two or more races. Hispanic or Latino of any race were 2.77% of the population.

Of the 3,596 households, 26.4% had children under the age of 18 living with them, 45.1% were married couples living together, 12.1% had a female householder with no husband present, and 38.6% were non-families. 34.7% of all households were made up of individuals, and 18.0% had someone living alone who was 65 years of age or older.  The average household size was 2.24 and the average family size was 2.86.

The city's age demographic was 22.3% under the age of 18, 8.8% from 18 to 24, 26.0% from 25 to 44, 22.1% from 45 to 64, and 20.8% who were 65 years of age or older.  The median age was 40 years. For every 100 females, there were 86.8 males.  For every 100 females age 18 and over, there were 83.4 males.

The median household income in the city was $25,358, and the median family income was $34,432. Males had a median income of $32,621, versus $18,765 for females. The per capita income for the city was $14,671.  About 13.9% of families and 18.6% of the population were below the poverty line, including 27.0% of those under age 18 and 10.7% of those age 65 or over.

Notable people 

 Clyde L. Choate, politician, World War II Medal of Honor recipient
William A. Denning, Illinois Supreme Court justice and state representative, practiced law in Frankfort
 Kenneth J. Gray, politician, World War II Victory Medal recipient
 Tim Lee Hall, politician
 Max Morris, athlete, played in both the NBA and AAFC
 Hal Smith, member of the 1960 Pittsburgh Pirates World Series championship team
 Joe Wendryhoski, athlete, former NFL lineman for the Los Angeles Rams and New Orleans Saints

Events, media, and recognition
Each year West Frankfort hosts the Old King Coal Festival. This four-day event is held every May. Now coinciding with Rend Lake Festival, held in nearby Benton. Formerly the Old King Coal Festival was held in the third week of September; to pay tribute to coal miners with a parade, concerts, pageants, carnival rides and a wide variety of food.

West Frankfort is also home to Candy Cane Lane, a large lights display featured every year around Christmas. The display involves several blocks of homes, including a large display by a local art teacher. In 2019, areas of Candy Cane Lane were featured on the ABC show The Great Christmas Light Fight.

West Frankfort is home to the Frankfort Area Historical Museum, which operates in a renovated 3 story Logan Grade School. The Society features a large research library, and maintains a microfilm of U.S. Census and local newspapers.

West Frankfort was formerly home to the Daily American Newspaper, which operated for nearly 100 years. The newspaper was replaced by the West Frankfort Gazette, and replaced again by the Franklin County Gazette as of 2020.

Three Angels Broadcasting Network (3ABN), a Christian broadcasting network, operates their world headquarters outside of town.

WITM-FM on 88.7 will be 3ABN Radio Music Channel's first affiliate to play Christian music 24 hours a day, 7 days a week.

West Frankfort was formerly the home of at least two radio stations, and local media source WFCN News operates outside of town.

References

External links
 
 West Frankfort Daily American newspaper

Cities in Franklin County, Illinois
Cities in Illinois
Populated places in Southern Illinois
Populated places established in 1811
Coal mining disasters in Illinois
1811 establishments in Illinois Territory
1951 mining disasters
1951 in Illinois
1951 disasters in the United States
December 1951 events in the United States
1947 mining disasters
1929 mining disasters